Overdrive is the second full-length album from Surrey based alternative rock band Fastlane. It was released in May 2007 by Punktastic Recordings.

Track listing

Personnel
Fastlane
 Ben Phillips – Vocals
 Matt O'Grady – Guitar
 Adam Biffen – Guitar
 Ian Maynard – Bass
 Gary Tough – Drums

References

External links
 Official Website
 MySpace

2007 albums
Fastlane (band) albums